Notable people with the name Barbi include:

Surname
 The Barbi Twins, Shane Barbi and Sia Barbi, (born 1963), identical twin models, authors and animal rights activists 
 Alice Barbi (1858–1948) Italian singer and violinist
 Ciccio Barbi (1919–1992) Italian actor
 Roberto Barbi (born 1965) Italian long-distance runner

Given name
 Barbi Benton (born 1950 as Barbara Klein), Playboy model, actress and singer
 Barbi Franklin, U.S. singer-songwriter of the duo Terry and Barbi Franklin
 Barbi Hayden (born 1990 as Callee Wilkerson) U.S. pro-wrestler
 "Barbi" Barbara Henneberger (1940–1964), German alpine skier